Events in the year 2017 in South Ossetia.

Incumbents
President: Leonid Tibilov (until 21 April); Anatoliy Bibilov (from 21 April)
Prime Minister: Domenty Kulumbegov

Events

9 April – South Ossetian presidential election, 2017, won by Anatoliy Bibilov.
9 April – Following a name change referendum, the constitution will be amended to denominate the formal name of the country from "Republic of South Ossetia" to "Republic of South Ossetia–the State of Alania" ("South Ossetia–Alania" for short).

Deaths

References

 
2010s in South Ossetia
Years of the 21st century in South Ossetia
South Ossetia
South Ossetia